Second Lieutenant Michael Paul Benner GC (14 April 1935 – 1 July 1957), known as Paul Benner, of the Corps of Royal Engineers was posthumously awarded the George Cross for gallantry for his actions in an alpine rescue attempt at Grossglockner, Austria on 1 July 1957.

He was born in Greenwich on 14 April 1935 and educated at Canford School in Dorset.  The award of the George Cross was published in The London Gazette on 17 June 1958.

References

British recipients of the George Cross
1935 births
1957 deaths
People educated at Canford School
Royal Engineers officers
Mountaineering deaths
People from Greenwich
Sport deaths in Austria
20th-century British Army personnel